Governor Drake may refer to:

Dawsonne Drake (1724–1784), Governor of Manila from 1762 to 1764, Governor of White Town from 1742 to 1762
Francis William Drake (1724–1788/89), Governor of Newfoundland from 1750 to 1752